The Battle of Aqbat al-Bakr (2 June 1010) was a battle of the Fitna of al-Andalus that took place in the area in and around Espiel, Spain. The battle took place between the forces of the Caliphate of Cordoba, whose forces were commanded by Sulayman ibn al-Hakam, and the Muslim rebel forces of the Catalan-Andalusian alliance trying to overthrow their Caliph overlords under the command of Muhammad ibn Hisham; Wadih al-Siqlabi, governor of al-Tagr al-Awsat; and several West Frankish counts and bishops, including Ermengol I of Urgell, Hugh I of Empúries, and Ramon Borrell of Barcelona.

The two armies met at Espiel on 2 June 1010 and the forces of the Caliphate of Cordoba were decisively routed, marking one of the first battles of the war and a significant gain for the rebel Catalan-Andalusian alliance. Although this battle took place in the general time frame of the Spanish Reconquista, it was not unusual for Christian and Muslim forces to join together to achieve common goals.

References 

 The information in this article is translated from its Spanish equivalent.

Aqbat al-Bakr
Aqbat al-Bakr
Aqbat al-Bakr
Aqbat al-Bakr
Aqbat al-Bakr
11th century in Al-Andalus
1010 in Europe
Aqbat al-Bakr
History of the province of Córdoba, Spain